Châteauneuf-de-Galaure is a commune in the Drôme department in southeastern France.

Châteauneuf-de-Galaure has a Franciscan abbey, in the course of being restored, with a cart-track.

Geography
The Galaure flows southwest through the southern part of the commune.

Population

Notable people
 Marthe Robin (1902-1981), Roman Catholic mystic, stigmatic and foundress

See also
Communes of the Drôme department

References

Communes of Drôme